Rashad Shaheed Anderson (born November 9, 1983) is an American former professional basketball player. He played college basketball at the University of Connecticut.

Early life 
Rashad's first interest was baseball.  His cousin introduced him to basketball when he was 10 years old. At age 13 he played on an AAU team that placed third in the nation. The following year on the 14 and under AAU team, they placed second in the country.

High school career
At Kathleen High School in Lakeland, Florida, Anderson averaged 22.8 points a game and finished as the second leading scorer in school history. In his junior year at Kathleen, Anderson helped the Red Devils win the State Championship. As a senior, he was one of the top 50 recruits in the nation, he was named an All-American, leading his team to a 106–24 record in his four seasons.

College career
Anderson chose UConn over the University of Florida, University of Tennessee, and University of Texas.  He had a great career at UConn and was known as "the dagger" by UConn head coach Jim Calhoun because of his penchant for hitting shots at key moments of games. Anderson finished his career with 276 three-pointers, the most in UConn history.

Freshman
Anderson played in all 33 games, mostly coming off the bench, although he started in the last four contests of the regular season. He finished fourth on the squad with 8.2 ppg. His season high for points was 22 at Notre Dame which included 6 for 9 from beyond the arc.

Sophomore
In the 2004 season, Anderson finished as third leading scorer for NCAA champion Huskies with 11.2 ppg. He reached double figures in 19 total games on the season and was named to the NCAA Final Four All-Tournament Team after scoring 18 points vs. Georgia Tech in the Championship game and 14 points vs. Duke. In the NCAA Tournament he averaged 17.3 points and .488 from three-point range (21-of-43). His 21 threes set a UConn single-tournament record. Rashad scored 28 points in NCAA Elite Eight win over Alabama, matching the school-NCAA record of six three-pointers he set in First Round win over Vermont.

Junior
In his junior season, Anderson was placed in the starting role.  He started 15 of 24 games at the shooting guard spot and finished as team's third leading scorer with 11.9 ppg. In February of that year, he was hospitalised for 13 days and missed seven games due to skin abscess in his right leg. He returned to action for the Big East Tournament. His season high for points was 27, including 16 in final 13 minutes, in a win over Rice.

Senior
Anderson was a big important off the bench and as a senior and was the leading scorer among players not in the starting lineup.  He earned All-Big East Honorable Mention honors, and averaged 12.8 points off the bench in 22.4 minutes of play. He reached double figures in 26 games. In one of the more memorable games of his collegiate career, Anderson scored the game-tying three-pointer at end of regulation against the Washington Huskies during the regional semifinals of the 2006 NCAA National Tournament sending the game into overtime with a score tied at 82. UConn went on to win in overtime, 98 to 92.  Anderson ended that game with 19 points.

Professional career
After going undrafted in the 2006 NBA draft, Anderson joined the Washington Wizards for the 2006 NBA Summer League. Later that year, he signed with Aigaleo of Greece for the 2006–07 Greek Basket League season.

In 2007, he signed with TDShop.it Livorno of Italy for the 2007–08 season.

Next season Anderson also stayed in Italy, where he joined top division's team Snaidero Udine, where he became league's leading scorer (18.2ppg) in 2008–09 Lega Basket Serie A season.

In November 2009, Anderson was acquired by the Iowa Energy in the 1st round of the 2009 NBA D-League draft. On January 9, 2010, he was waived by the Energy. On January 13, he was acquired by the Fort Wayne Mad Ants. On February 1, 2010, his contract was terminated by the Mad Ants. The next day, he signed with Vanoli Basket of Italy. Later that year, he signed with BK Ventspils of Latvia for the 2010–11 season. During 2011–12, Anderson spent time in Iran. In December 2012, he signed with Amchit Club of Lebanon. He later signed with Al Riyadi. In February 2013, Anderson signed with Cocodrilos de Caracas of Venezuela.

In April 2013, Anderson signed with Champville of Lebanon.

On November 1, 2013, he was acquired by the Texas Legends. On November 4, he was traded to the Canton Charge. On December 30, 2013, he was waived by the Charge. In January 2014, he signed with STB Le Havre of France.

On October 5, 2016, Anderson joined Promitheas Patras returning to the Greek Basket League after 10 years.

References

External links
Profile at Eurobasket.com

1983 births
Living people
Aigaleo B.C. players
American expatriate basketball people in France
American expatriate basketball people in Greece
American expatriate basketball people in Iran
American expatriate basketball people in Israel
American expatriate basketball people in Italy
American expatriate basketball people in Latvia
American expatriate basketball people in Lebanon
American expatriate basketball people in Venezuela
American men's basketball players
Basketball players from Florida
BK Ventspils players
Canton Charge players
Cocodrilos de Caracas players
Hapoel Haifa B.C. players
Iowa Energy players
Parade High School All-Americans (boys' basketball)
Promitheas Patras B.C. players
Sportspeople from Lakeland, Florida
Shooting guards
Small forwards
STB Le Havre players
UConn Huskies men's basketball players
Vanoli Cremona players
Al Riyadi Club Beirut basketball players